Edward James Warwick (21 July 1904 – September 1986) was a British boxer. He competed in the men's flyweight event at the 1924 Summer Olympics and fought as Teddy Warwick.

Warwick won the 1923, 1924 and 1925 Amateur Boxing Association British flyweight title and the 1927 bantamweight title, when boxing out of the Columbia ABC.

References

External links
 

1904 births
1986 deaths
British male boxers
Olympic boxers of Great Britain
Boxers at the 1924 Summer Olympics
Place of birth missing
Flyweight boxers